Tollerton is a village and civil parish in the Hambleton District of North Yorkshire, England.

History

No date for the establishment of a settlement at Tollerton has been determined but it was part of the old royal Forest of Galtres until 1630. Tollerton is mentioned in the Domesday Book as Tolentun in the ancient wapentake of Bulford in the North Riding and was owned by the church of St Peter in York. In the 12th century, the wapentake was renamed as the wapentake of Bulmer.

Until the latter half of the 20th century, the village had a small railway halt, which was closed in November 1965.

Governance

The village lies within Thirsk and Malton parliamentary constituency. It also lies within the Tollerton ward of Hambleton District Council and the Easingwold electoral district of North Yorkshire County Council. The population of this ward taken at the 2011 Census was 2,090.

Geography

The village lies is adjacent to the East Coast Main Line railway, though the nearest stations are either at York or Thirsk. The River Kyle flows to the south west of the village.

Demography
According to the 2001 UK Census, there were 824 people in 317 households across the Tollerton Parish. Of those households, 269 were owner occupied with 188 being detached dwellings. Of the total population, 637 were over 16 years of age of which 432 were actively employed.

By the time of the 2011 UK Census, the parish had grown to 1,026 residents across 395 dwellings. In 2015, North Yorkshire County Council estimated the population of the parish to have risen again to 1,070.

Religion

There is a church, dedicated to St Michael, that was completed in 1955. The dedication ceremony was conducted by the then Bishop of Selby, Carey Knyvett.

Village amenities

There is a public house, the Black Horse, which hosts an annual Mini Horticultural Show on the first Sunday in September. On the east side of the railway line is a caravan park next to the Station Inn Restaurant and pub.  The Tollerton Stores shop won the Hambleton District award for Best Village Store in 2010. There is a village hall and a sports ground. The village hall was built as a war memorial rather than having the more traditional cross or column. It was completed in January 1921 with a dedication service held on 31 January 1921. Tollerton Tennis Club play competitively in the York & District and Hovingham Leagues.

Since 1256 when Henry II granted the Treasurer of York a charter, there have been weekly and annual fairs and markets until very recently.

Footnotes and references

External links

Hambleton Council page on Tollerton
Map link
Tollerton website

Villages in North Yorkshire
Civil parishes in North Yorkshire